I Am Rich is a 2008 mobile app for iPhones which had minimal function and was priced at .  The app was pulled from the App Store after less than 24 hours.  Receiving poor reviews from critics, only eight copies were sold.  In the years since, several similar applications have been released at lower prices.

Overview
I Am Rich was developed by Armin Heinrich.  The app only showed a glowing red gem and an icon that, when pressed, displayed the following mantra in large text:

The application is described as "a work of art with no hidden function at all", with its only purpose being to show other people that they were able to afford it.  Vox writer Zachary Crockett called it "the ultimate Veblen good in app form".

Release
Heinrich released and distributed I Am Rich through the App Store on August 5, 2008. The application was removed from the App Store without explanation by Apple less than a day after its release.

Purchases

Eight people bought the application, at least one of whom claimed to have done so accidentally.  Six US sales and two European sales netted $5,600 for Heinrich and $2,400 for Apple (respectively equivalent to $ and $ in ).  In correspondence with the Los Angeles Times, Heinrich told the newspaper that Apple had refunded two purchasers of his app, and that he was happy to not have dissatisfied customers.

Reception
Discussing the app on the website Silicon Alley Insider, Dan Frommer described the program as a "scam", "worthless", and finally "a joke that smells like a scammy rip-off" on August 5, 6, and 8, respectively.  Without purchasing the app, Fox News' Paul Wagenseil guessed that the secret mantra was "German for 'Sucker! (Heinrich is German).  Wired's Brian X. Chen described I Am Rich as a waste of money to "prove you're a jerk", and contrasted the expenditure with donating to cancer foundations and Third World countries.

Heinrich told the Los Angeles Times Mark Milian that he had received correspondence from satisfied customers, "I've got e-mails from customers telling me that they really love the app [... and that they had] no trouble spending the money".

Similar applications
The next year, Heinrich released I Am Rich LE. Some customers were disappointed by the new functionality, poorly rating the app due to its ostensible improvements.

On February 23, 2009, CNET Asia reported on the "conceptually similar" app, I Am Richer, developed by Mike DG for Google's Android.

With the same name, the I Am Rich that was released on the Windows Phone Marketplace on December 22, 2010 was developed by DotNetNuzzi.  Described by MobileCrunch as equally useless as the original, this app cost , the price cap imposed by Microsoft.

See also

References

2008 software
discontinued iOS software
iOS software
mobile applications
novelty software